The 2022 AFL draft will consist of the various periods where the 18 clubs in the Australian Football League (AFL) can trade and recruit players during and following the completion of the 2022 AFL season.

2022 Covid top-up players 

Due to the League wanting to ensure that matches are not cancelled or postponed during the ongoing Covid-19 pandemic, each club named twenty players to their Covid top-up player list. For Victorian based teams, all of these players played for their affiliated reserves team or junior development academy, or for clubs outside of Victoria, the majority were sourced from the local second level leagues.

In round 2, West Coast became the first club to utilise the top-up player pool, when they had twelve players unable to play due to the AFL's health and safety protocols. Five players, Angus Dewar, Aaron Black, Stefan Giro, Declan Mountford and Brayden Ainsworth were chosen to play against North Melbourne.

Key Dates

2022 mid-season rookie draft 

The mid-season draft will be held after the conclusion of Round 11 of the 2022 AFL season on 1 June. The draft was only open to clubs with inactive players on their list and vacancies available, such as long term injuries or retirements.

Previous trades

Player movements

Free agency

  received no compensation pick for Zaine Cordy due to signing Liam Jones

Trades

List changes

Retirements

Delistings

North Melbourne concessions 

 A second-round pick and third-round pick in the 2023 AFL Draft: at least one of these picks must be traded for a player during the 2022 trade period.
  will not carry the picks into 2023, but they will be tied to their finishing position.
 Two extra Category A Rookie list spots.

2022 national draft

Rookie elevations

2023 rookie draft

Category B rookie selections

Pre-season supplemental selection period

See also 
 2022 AFL Women's draft

References

Australian Football League draft
Draft
AFL Draft
2020s in Melbourne
Australian rules football in Victoria (Australia)
Sport in Melbourne
Events in Melbourne